Santiago Valentín Ramírez Polero (born 3 September 2001) is a Uruguayan professional footballer who plays as a forward for Montevideo Wanderers, on loan from Nacional.

Career
A youth academy graduate of Nacional, Ramírez made his professional debut on 15 January 2021 in Torneo Intermedio final against Montevideo Wanderers.

On 3 January 2023, Ramírez joined Montevideo Wanderers on a season long loan deal.

Personal life
Santiago is the younger brother of fellow footballer Ignacio Ramírez.

Career statistics

Honours
Nacional
Uruguayan Primera División: 2020, 2022

References

External links
 

2001 births
Living people
People from Mercedes, Uruguay
Association football forwards
Uruguayan footballers
Uruguayan Primera División players
Club Nacional de Football players
Montevideo Wanderers F.C. players